Tofail Ahmed (born 22 October 1943) is a Bangladeshi politician. He is a 7-term Jatiya Sangsad member representing the Bhola-1, Bhola-2 and Bakerganj-1 constituencies since 1973. Previously he served as the Minister of Commerce and Minister of Industries of the Government of Bangladesh.

Background

Ahmed was born on 22 October 1943 in Bhola in the then Bengal Presidency, British India.

Ahmed joined the Awami League and in support of the 1966 Six point movement of Sheikh Mujibur Rahman. was involved in the 1969 mass uprising in East Pakistan as a student leader. He was the vice-president of Dhaka University Central Students' Union. In 1970, Ahmed was a political secretary of Sheikh Mujibur Rahman. He was a Bangladesh independence activist one of the organizers of Mujib Bahini during the Bangladesh Liberation War in 1971.

Career
In 1996, prior to the controversial February elections, Ahmed was arrested along with Bangladesh Jamaat-e-Islami leader Abdul Quader Mollah under the Special Powers Act. He served as the Minister of Commerce in the Awami League government from July 1996 to January 2001.

In 2007, while the country went under emergency rule Ahmed was one of the leaders who proposed a reform proposal of Bangladesh Awami League which proposed by the military backed caretaker government and the removal of party chief Sheikh Hasina. After the 2008 general election Awami League formed the government, but Ahmed was dropped from the cabinet despite being the one of the influential member of Presidium.

Ahmed was the chairman of the Parliamentary Standing Committee on Industries Ministry. He is also the member of the advisory committee of the Awami League. Earlier he was one of the influential members of the Awami League presidium. He was elected several times as a member of Jatiya Sangsad from Bhola constituency. He was the Minister of Commerce.

References

Living people
1943 births
Awami League politicians
1st Jatiya Sangsad members
3rd Jatiya Sangsad members
5th Jatiya Sangsad members
7th Jatiya Sangsad members
9th Jatiya Sangsad members
10th Jatiya Sangsad members
11th Jatiya Sangsad members
Industries ministers of Bangladesh
Commerce ministers of Bangladesh
Bangladesh Krishak Sramik Awami League central committee members